This is a list of South Korean football transfers in the winter transfer window 2013–14 by club. Only transfers of both K League Classic (Division 1) and K League Challenge (Division 2) are included.

K League Classic

Busan IPark

In:

Out:

FC Seoul

In:

Out:

Gyeongnam FC

In:

Out:

Incheon United

In:

Out:

Jeju United

In:

Out:

Jeonbuk Hyundai Motors

In:

Out:

Jeonnam Dragons

In:

Out:

Pohang Steelers

In:

Out:

Sangju Sangmu

In:

Out:

Seongnam FC

In:

Out:

Suwon Bluewings

In:

Out:

Ulsan Hyundai

In:

Out:

K League Challenge

Ansan Police

In:

Out:

Bucheon FC 1995

In:

Out:

Chungju Hummel

In:

Out:

Daegu FC

In:

Out:

Daejeon Citizen

In:

Out:

FC Anyang

In:

Out:

Gangwon FC

In:

Out:

Goyang Hi FC

In:

Out:

Gwangju FC

In:

Out:

Suwon FC

In:

Out:

References

South Korean
2013-14
Transfers
Transfers